Mišnjak is an islet in Croatia just off the coast of Rab. The ferry that forms part of the D105 highway passes by it on the way to Stinica.

Misnjak is the busiest ferry port of island Rab operating year-round connecting the island to land. 

Islets of Croatia
Rab
Uninhabited islands of Croatia
Islands of the Adriatic Sea

External links
 Rab ferry information
 Misnjak ferry timetable